Lawen is an unincorporated community in Harney County, Oregon, United States.  It has a post office with a ZIP code 97720. Lawen lies along Oregon Route 78 just south of its interchanges with Oregon Route 205, U.S. Route 20, and U.S. Route 395 in Burns, the county seat. Lawen is just north of the East Fork Silvies River and Malheur Lake.

Climate
According to the Köppen Climate Classification system, Lawen has a semi-arid climate, abbreviated "BSk" on climate maps.

Education
Crane Union High School opened in 1918 in Lawen and moved to Crane in 1920.

Harney County is not in a community college district but has a "contract out of district" (COD) with Treasure Valley Community College. TVCC operates the Burns Outreach Center in Burns.

References

Unincorporated communities in Harney County, Oregon
Unincorporated communities in Oregon